Beechgrove (formerly known as The Beechgrove Garden) is a television programme broadcast since 1978 on BBC Scotland. Over the years it has been broadcast on BBC Scotland, BBC One Scotland, BBC Two Scotland and Britbox.

History
Beechgrove is a gardening programme, which started on 14 April 1978. It was inspired by the garden behind the home of WGBH in Boston, Massachusetts, named the Victory Garden. The original plot of land used was the small area of garden attached to the BBC studios in Beechgrove Terrace, Aberdeen. Due to its small size, the programme's popularity and the fact the garden had been transformed several times over, a new area of ground to the west of Aberdeen was acquired for the programme by Tern Television who have produced the series since 1992. The new site covers 2.5 acres and is located at the former Grampian Regional Council Brotherfield Nursery, in Westhill, Aberdeenshire. Episodes were broadcast from the site in 1996.

The show was once parodied in the BBC Scotland comedy sketch show Scotch and Wry, with Rikki Fulton as George Barron and Gregor Fisher as Jim McColl (dubbed the sunshine boyos) "growing" whisky.

Since the 1980s, The Beechgrove Garden has been shown intermittently on the BBC in England usually in non-prime time slots during the day. Since 2013 The Beechgrove Garden has been broadcast in the rest of the UK, usually early on a Sunday morning slot.

On 17 June 1983, the 100th show was broadcast.

In 1990, the decision was made to redevelop the garden, which meant literally uprooting everything and starting again. It caused an outcry from the press and public, but it went ahead and led to a public auction for keepsake plants from The Beechgrove.

There was even bigger change six years later, when the garden moved from its original home to an exposed, rural hillside on the outskirts of Aberdeen.

In 1992, The Hit Squad with Jim McKirdy and Walter Gilmour was launched. They revamped gardens in need, according to presenter Jim McColl, they started all today's make-over shows.

Episodes of the show have been transmitted across the world, from Canada, the Netherlands, Madeira, Italy and Jersey.

The 1,000th episode was filmed in May 2016. During the 2020 pandemic and the subsequent lockdown, the presenters filmed episodes from their own gardens. George Anderson was filming in his home in Joppa, Edinburgh. Kirsty Wilson was presenting from her flat in Edinburgh, Brian Cunningham was in his garden in Scone and Carole Baxter will film from her garden in Aberdeenshire.
2022 was the 30th year of production company, 'Tern' producing Beechgrove for BBC Scotland.

Theme
The theme tune for the show is the jig "Miss Tara MacAdam", written by Phil Cunningham. This replaced the show's original theme tune, "Sponge".

Presenters
The current Presenters are:

 Carole Baxter (1986–current)
 Chris Beardshaw (2013–current)
 George Anderson (2005–current)
 Brian Cunningham (2015-current)
 Kirsty Wilson (2019-current)
 Calum Clunie (2021-current) 

Previous presenters on the programme included:

 Jim McColl (1978–1988, 1993–2019)
 George Barron (1978–1984) 
 Dick Gardiner (1984–1990)
 Sid Robertson (1990–1994)
 Bill Torrance (1990–1999)
 Walter Gilmour (1984–)
 Jim McKirdy. (1984–)
 Carolyn Spray (1995–2014)
 Lesley Watson (1995–2013)

Programme side-shoots

Beechgrove Repotted 
Beechgrove Repotted is one of Beechgrove's side-shoots. Repotted is a 2019 series of reversions that have been moulded to form a series of programmes which all explore a specific gardening theme. Themes include: 

 Gardening on a Budget
 Garden Art
 Gardens on the Edge
 Community Allotments 
 Garden Therapy
 Garden for Wildlife
 Urban Gardens
 Growing Communities

The Beechgrove Potting Shed
A sister programme, The Beechgrove Potting Shed, was broadcast weekly on BBC Radio Scotland between 1978 and 2012. Presented in its latter years by Theresa Talbot, it was axed as part of a cost-cutting measure by the station.

References

External links
Beechgrove Garden website
"Miss Tara MacAdam" entry on thesession.org

BBC Scotland television shows
Gardening in Scotland
1978 Scottish television series debuts
Culture in Aberdeen
1970s Scottish television series
1980s Scottish television series
1990s Scottish television series
2000s Scottish television series
2010s Scottish television series
2020s Scottish television series
Gardening television